, trading as FN Herstal and often referred to as Fabrique Nationale or simply FN, is a leading firearms manufacturer based in Herstal, Belgium. It is currently the largest exporter of military small arms in Europe.

FN Herstal is owned by the Herstal Group holding company, which is in turn owned by the regional government of Wallonia. The Herstal Group also owns the Browning Arms Company and the U.S. Repeating Arms Company (Winchester).

FN America is the U.S. subsidiary of FN Herstal, which was formed by the merger of FN's previous two American subsidiaries – FN Manufacturing and FNH USA. A United Kingdom based manufacturing facility, FNH UK, is also in operation.

Firearms designed and/or manufactured by FN include the Browning Hi-Power and Five-seven pistols, the FAL, FNC, F2000 and SCAR rifles, the P90 submachine gun, the M2 Browning, MAG, Minimi and the FN Evolys machine guns; all have been commercially successful. FN Herstal's firearms are used by the armed forces of over 100 countries.

History

FN Herstal originated in the small city of Herstal, near Liège. The Fabrique Nationale d'Armes de Guerre (French for 'National Factory of Weapons of War') was established in 1889 to manufacture 150,000 Mauser Model 89 rifles ordered by the Belgian government. FN was co-founded by the major arms makers of the Liège region, with Henri Pieper of Anciens Etablissements Pieper being the driving force and the primary shareholder of the new company. In 1897, the company entered into a long-lasting relationship with John Browning, a well-known American firearms designer.

The company was an important manufacturer of motor vehicles in Belgium, a development championed by Alexandre Galopin as managing director. FN cars were produced in Herstal from the early 1900s until 1935. Production of FN motorcycles continued until 1965, and production of trucks until 1970. In 1973, FN changed its name to reflect a diversified product line far beyond just military Small Arms and Firearms manufacturing, adopting the current name of Fabrique Nationale d'Herstal.

One of Fabrique Nationale's handguns, a Model 1910 semi-automatic pistol in 9×17mm (.380 ACP) (serial number 19074), was one of four weapons that were taken from the assassins of Archduke Franz Ferdinand of Austria, although it is unknown which of the four weapons fired the fatal round.

Browning began the development of the GP35 "High Power" pistol, the GP standing for Grande Puissance (French for high power), which is well-known as the Browning Hi-Power. The weapon was finalized by FN's Dieudonné Saive and did not appear until 1935, nearly a decade after Browning's death; it remained in production until 2017.

The FN Manufacturing LLC plant in Columbia, South Carolina, is part of the military division of FN. It is primarily responsible for the production of U.S. military weapons, such as M16 rifles, M249 light machine guns, M240 machine guns, and M2 machine guns.

Weapons

Handguns
 Barracuda: Double-action multi-caliber revolver that can be switched between three calibers (9×19mm Parabellum, .38 Special and .357 Magnum) by changing parts of the cylinder.
 FN 510: 10mm Auto caliber semi automatic pistol.
 FN 509: Redesigned version of the FNS pistol, chambered in 9×19mm Parabellum.
 FN 503: Subcompact concealed carry pistol, inspired by the FN 509 series.
 FN Five-seven: Lightweight polymer-framed pistol with a 20-round magazine capacity, and designed to use FN's 5.7×28mm cartridge. In service with military and police forces in over 40 nations throughout the world.
 FN HiPer: The FN HiPer is a semi automatic striker fired pistol. The weapon is chambered in 9x19mm NATO and fed from a 15 round magazine.
 FN FNP: Series of polymer-framed pistols offered in 9×19mm Parabellum, .357 SIG, .40 S&W, and .45 ACP.
 FN FNX: Updated and reengineered version of the FNP series pistol in 9×19mm Parabellum, .40 S&W and .45 ACP.
 FN FNS: Polymer striker-fired pistols in 9×19mm Parabellum and 40 S&W.
 FN 49: Pistol chambered for 9×19mm Parabellum and .40 S&W.
 FN/Browning Hi-Power: Single-action pistol chambered for 9×19mm Parabellum and .40 S&W. One of the most widely used military pistols of all time, having been used by the armed forces of over 50 nations.
 FN Grand Browning: M1911 pistol intended for the European market chambered in 9.65x23mm Browning.
 HP-DA: 9×19mm Parabellum pistol, double-action variant of the Browning Hi-Power.
 Model 1900: .32 ACP blowback semi-automatic pistol.
 Model 1903: Blowback semi-automatic pistol chambered for .32 ACP and 9×20mm Long Browning.
 Model 1905: .25 ACP vest pocket blowback semi-automatic pistol.
 Model 1910: Single-action pistol chambered for .32 ACP and .380 ACP.
 Model 1922: Similar to the FN 1910 but with a longer barrel.
 FN Baby Browning: Simplified redesign of the 1905 Vest Pocket, also chambered for .25 ACP

Submachine guns
 P90: Ambidextrous bullpup personal defense weapon with a top-mounted 50-round magazine and chambered for FN's 5.7×28mm cartridge. In service with military and police forces in over 40 countries.
 Uzi: Built under licence from Israel Military Industries.
 M12: built under licence from Beretta. Chambered in 9x19 mm with 30-round magazine capable of firing in semi-auto,3 round burst and full auto.

Rifles
 Trombone
 Browning 22 Semi-Auto rifle .22 LR, .22 Short. Takedown rifle. Production began in 1914 and continued through 1974 in Belgium.
 CAL: Carabine Automatique Légère, 5.56×45mm NATO assault rifle.
 F2000: 5.56×45mm NATO bullpup assault rifle, part of a system with a computerized sight and 40mm grenade launcher or 12 gauge shotgun.
FS2000: Semi-automatic sporting version of the F2000 rifle.
 FAL: Fusil Automatique Léger, 7.62×51mm NATO battle rifle. One of the most widely used rifles in history, having been used by over 90 nations.
FN-15
 FNAR: Semi-automatic rifle chambered in 7.62×51mm NATO.
 FNC: Fabrique Nationale Carabine, 5.56×45mm NATO assault rifle.
 IWS: 6.5x43mm caliber assault rifle.
 M16: 5.56×45mm NATO rifle (produced under licence by Colt Defense via a U.S. Government contract since 1991, by FNH USA).
 M4A1: 5.56×45mm NATO rifle (produced under contract from the U.S. Government since 2013 by FNH USA).
 Mle 1930: Belgian variant of the Browning M1918, chambered in 7.65×53mm Belgian Mauser.
 Model 1949: Semi-automatic rifle / selective fire automatic rifle chambered in .30-06 Springfield, 7.92×57mm Mauser, 7.62×51mm NATO, and 7×57mm Mauser.
 PS90: Semi-automatic sporting carbine version of the P90 submachine gun.
 SCAR: SOF Combat Assault Rifle, modular assault/battle rifle system with dedicated versions in 5.56×45mm NATO and 7.62×51mm NATO.

Bolt-action rifles
 Mauser Model 1889 and derivatives
 Mauser Model 1893
 Model 1924 / Model 1930: Carbine and rifle based on the Mauser 98 carbine.
 Karabiner 98k: 7.92×57mm Mauser bolt-action rifle produced post-World War II.
 Model 1950: .30-06 Springfield bolt-action rifle; updated version of the Model 1930.
 Model 30-11: 7.62×51mm NATO bolt-action sniper rifle developed from FN-built Mauser Karabiner 98k rifles.
 FN Ballista: Modular .338 Lapua Magnum long range sniper rifle that is convertible to .308 Winchester or .300 Winchester Magnum calibers.
 Patrol Bolt Rifle: 7.62×51mm NATO bolt-action rifle intended for police patrol cruisers.
 Special Police Rifle: Special Police Rifle; bolt-action sniper rifle based on the Winchester Model 70, chambered in 7.62×51mm NATO and .300 Winchester Magnum, intended for FBI and SWAT teams.
 Tactical Sport Rifle: Tactical Sports Rifle based on the SPR.

Machine guns
 FN BRG-15: Experimental heavy machine gun chambered in 15.5×115mm.
 M2 Browning: .50 BMG (12.7×99mm NATO) heavy machine gun produced under licence.
 MAG: Mitrailleuse A Gaz, 7.62×51mm NATO general-purpose machine gun. Used by more than 80 nations, and made under licence in countries such as Argentina, Egypt, India, Singapore, the United Kingdom and the United States as M240 machine gun.
 Minimi: Mini Mitrailleuse, 5.56×45mm NATO light machine gun. In service in over 75 nations and used in the United States as the M249 SAW.
 Mark 48 machine gun: Variant of the M249 light machine gun. Chambered in 7.62×51mm NATO, and developed to meet a United States special forces requirement.
 FN BAR Model 1930 BAR: Licence-built version of the M1918 BAR, rechambered for the 7.92×57mm Mauser cartridge.
 M3 (FN M3M/GAU-21 and FN M3P): A belt-fed heavy machine gun which is a modernized form of the M2 Browning .50 caliber heavy machine gun. It is intended for vehicle, watercraft and aircraft mounting.
FN EVOLYS: A machine gun developed in 2021, chambered for 5.56x45mm and 7.62x51mm ammunition

Shotguns
 FN P-12: 12-gauge pump-action shotgun with 18-inch barrel and 5-round capacity.
 FN Self-loading Police: 12-gauge gas-operated semi-automatic shotgun offered in four different models with various barrel lengths, sight options, and capacities. Introduced in 2008, and named "2009 Shotgun of the Year" by American Rifleman magazine.
 FN Tactical Police Shotgun: 12-gauge pump-action shotgun with 5 or 8-round capacity. It is an upgraded version of the Winchester Repeating Arms Company Winchester 1300.
 Browning Auto-5 recoil-operated semi-automatic shotgun with 5-round capacity, designed by John Browning.

Helicopter and aircraft weapon systems
 Mitrailleuse d´Avion Browning - F.N. Calibre 13,2 mm: Heavy airplane machine gun. It was an improved M2 Browning for use in aircraft during WWII. The weapon had increased firerate and fired a more powerful 13.2x99 Hotchkiss cartridge. FN also invented a high velocity high explosive variant of the cartridge just for this weapon.
 FN HMP250: Heavy Machine Gun Pod. It is a system featuring a .50 cal FN M3P machine gun, a 275-round ammunition box, and a links and cases collector.
 FN HMP400: Heavy Machine Gun Pod. It is a system featuring a .50 cal FN M3P machine gun, a 400-round ammunition box capacity, and a links or links and cases collector.
 FN RMP: Rocket Machine Gun Pod. It is system comprising a 12.7mm (.50 caliber) FN M3P machine gun, a NATO Standard 2.75inch/70mm 3-tube rocket launcher and a 400-round machine gun ammunition box.

Miscellaneous
 5.56×45mm SS109: NATO standard 5.56×45mm cartridge.
 5.7×28mm: Small-caliber, high-velocity cartridge designed for use with the FN P90 PDW and FN Five-seven pistol.
 EGLM: 40mm Ergonomic Grenade Launcher Module designed for the FN SCAR.
 303: Less-lethal 17 mm multi-shot projectile launcher.
 303 Pistol: Pistol version of the less-lethal FN 303 launcher.
 FN Telgren telescoping shoot-through rifle-grenade.
 In 1938 the FN modified M1919 Browning aircraft guns to accept 7.5mm French rounds (modification known as "FN Mle 38")

See also
 Arms industry
 List of modern armament manufacturers

References

External links

 
  (FN America)
 
 

Ammunition manufacturers
 
 
Firearm manufacturers of Belgium
Herstal
Manufacturing companies of Belgium
Société Générale de Belgique
Companies based in Liège Province